Kyrano is a fictional character featured in the 1960s British Supermarionation television series Thunderbirds and its 2004 live-action film adaptation.

Depiction

Original series
Kyrano is the father of Tin-Tin and half-brother of The Hood. He is the manservant in the Tracy household, sharing domestic duties with Grandma. He is renowned for serving tea and coffee within the house and is upset when Parker tries to take this duty from him in the episode "The Mighty Atom".

Kyrano was once the heir to a rubber plantation fortune in Malaysia but was cheated out of it by The Hood. After this, he decided to withdraw from the world of material gain and spend the rest of his life in meditation. He lived all over the world, pursuing careers as a chef in Paris, a gardener in England, and a scientist producing synthetic foods from plants for astronauts. When his old friend Jeff Tracy, founder of International Rescue, offered him a position on Tracy Island upon the organisation's formation, he accepted.

The Hood has a hypnotic power over Kyrano, which he sometimes uses to extract information on International Rescue and its secrets. Kyrano never mentions this to anyone, dismissing the Hood's telepathic intrusions as mere "dizzy spells" despite his otherwise unquestionable loyalty to the Tracys.

A widower, Kyrano's full name is never revealed in the series and he seems happy to be referred to by his surname.

Adaptations
In the 2004 film, Kyrano has a wife, Onaha. Kyrano appears to be his given name rather than his surname and he and his family are Malaysian Indian Muslims.

Kyrano does not appear in the 2015 remake series, in which he is said to be retired. However, his daughter (renamed Tanusha "Kayo" Kyrano) and brother are still major characters. In the episode "Signals – Part 1", Kayo mentions that her father was devastated by Jeff's disappearance and hopes that he will come out of retirement if Jeff is found alive.

Reception
Jon Abbott of TV Zone magazine describes the original Kyrano as a "fawning manservant" whom Jeff treats patronisingly, arguing that he represents a negative stereotype. Marcus Hearn regards him as a "poorly sketched character", calling his secret ties to the Hood "another of Thunderbirds weak links" and stating that the series reveals almost nothing of his and Tin-Tin's backstory.

References

External links
  www.fab1.co.nz – Thunderbirds Characters

Fictional chefs
Fictional horticulturists and gardeners
Fictional Malaysian people
Fictional male domestic workers
Fictional scientists
Indian film characters
Male characters in film
Male characters in television
Television characters introduced in 1965
Thunderbirds (TV series) characters